Salvia cynica is a perennial plant that is native to Sichuan province in China, growing in forests and streamsides at  elevation.

Notes

cynica
Flora of China